The men's lightweight event was part of the boxing programme at the 1972 Summer Olympics. The weight class allowed boxers of up to 60 kilograms to compete. The competition was held from 27 August to 10 September 1972. 37 boxers from 37 nations competed.

Medalists

Results
The following boxers took part in the event:

First round
 Guitry Bananier (FRA) def. Luis Davila (PUR), 4:1
 László Orbán (HUN) def. Mohamed Sourour (MAR), 5:0
 Giambattista Capretti (ITA) def. José Martínez (CAN), TKO-2
 Ivan Mikhailov (BUL) def. Roy Hurdley (PAN), TKO-2
 Hosain Eghmaz (IRI) def. Abdel Hady Khallaf Allah (EGY), TKO-2

Second round
 Charlie Nash (IRL) def. Erik Madsen (DEN), 5:0
 Antonio Gin (MEX) def. Courtney Atherly (GUY), 4:1
 Jan Szczepanski (POL) def. Kasamiro Marchlo (SUD), 5:0
 James Busceme (USA) def. Praianan Vichit (THA), 5:0
 Peter Hess (FRG) def. Enrique Requeiferos (CUB), 4:1
 Svein Erik Paulsen (NOR) def. Gennadi Dobrokhotov (URS), TKO-1
 Muniswamy Venu (IND) def. Neville Cole (GBR), TKO-3
 Samuel Mbugua (KEN) def. Girmaye Gabre (ETH), 5:0
 Karel Kaspar (TCH) def. Tatu Chionga (MLW), 5:0
 Alfonso Pérez (COL) def. Odhiambo (UGA), 5:0
 Khaidav Altanhuiag (MGL) def. Antonio Comaschi (ARG), 5:0
 Eraslan Doruk (TUR) def. Luis Rodríguez (VEN), 5:0
 Antoniu Vasile (ROU) def. Adeyemi Abayomi (NGR), TKO-2
 Kim Tai-Ho (KOR) def. Guitry Bananier (FRA), KO-3
 László Orbán (HUN) def. Giambattista Capretti (ITA), 4:1
 Ivan Mikhailov (BUL) def. Hosain Eghmaz (IRI), 3:2

Third round
 Charlie Nash (IRL) def. Antonio Gin (MEX), TKO-1
 Jan Szczepanski (POL) def. James Busceme (USA), 5:0
 Svein Erik Paulsen (NOR) def. Peter Hess (FRG), KO-2
 Samuel Mbugua (KEN) def. Muniswamy Venu (IND), 5:0
 Alfonso Pérez (COL) def. Karel Kaspar (TCH), 5:0
 Eraslan Doruk (TUR) def. Khaidav Altanhuiag (MGL), 3:2
 Kim Tai-Ho (KOR) def. Antoniu Vasile (ROU), TKO-1
 László Orbán (HUN) def. Ivan Mikhailov (BUL), 4:1

Quarterfinals
 Jan Szczepanski (POL) def. Charlie Nash (IRL), TKO-3
 Samuel Mbugua (KEN) def. Svein Erik Paulsen (NOR), 4:1
 Alfonso Pérez (COL) def. Eraslan Doruk (TUR), 3:2
 László Orbán (HUN) def. Kim Tai-Ho (KOR), 4:1

Semifinals
 Jan Szczepanski (POL) def. Samuel Mbugua (KEN), walk-over
 László Orbán (HUN) def. Alfonso Pérez (COL), 3:2

Final
 Jan Szczepanski (POL) def. László Orbán (HUN), 5:0

References

Lightweight